Ike Udeh is a retired Nigerian football (soccer) striker who played one season in Major League Soccer and one in the USISL.

Udeh played on both the Nigerian U-17 and U-21 teams before moving to the United States to attend Alabama A&M.  On February 1, 1997, the Kansas City Wizards selected Udeh in the second round (seventeenth overall) of the 1997 MLS College Draft.  The Wizards waived him on June 17, 1997.  In July, he signed with the Carolina Dynamo.  but an automobile accident left him severely injured. and he spent nine months in rehabilitation during which he earned his master's degree from Alabama A&M.  In May 1998, he joined the Jacksonville Cyclones of the USISL.

Udeh has an extensive resume of coaching high school soccer teams in Alabama.

References

External links
 

1973 births
Living people
Alabama A&M Bulldogs men's soccer players
Sporting Kansas City players
Nigerian footballers
Nigerian expatriate footballers
Nigerian football managers
Jacksonville Cyclones players
A-League (1995–2004) players
Sporting Kansas City draft picks
Expatriate soccer players in the United States
Association football forwards